Joanna Magdalena Tarnawska (born 1976 in Warsaw) is a Polish civil servant who serves as an ambassador to Nigeria since September 2018.

Joanna Tarnawska has spent her youth in Zambia where she attended Catholic elementary and high school. She has graduated from African studies, University of Warsaw. She worked for the Ministry of Environment. In September 2018 she was appointed as Poland ambassador to Nigeria, accredited to Benin, Cameroon, Equatorial Guinea, Ghana, Liberia, Sierra Leone, and Togo as well.

References 

1976 births
Ambassadors of Poland to Nigeria
Living people
Diplomats from Warsaw
University of Warsaw alumni